Taina José Lopes (born 18 August 2004), known as Taina Maranhão or just Maranhão, is a Brazilian footballer who plays as a forward for Santos.

Club career
Born in Criciúma, Santa Catarina, Taina Maranhão began her career at hometown side Criciúma, and appeared in three first team matches in the 2019 . In 2020, after a short period at Avaí, she moved to Internacional and was initially assigned to the under-18 team.

On 22 March 2021, Taina Maranhão and another ten players were promoted to Inters first team. Roughly one year later, she left the club, and was announced at Cruzeiro on 17 March 2022.

On 12 January 2023, Taina Maranhão was announced as the new signing of Santos.

Personal life
Taina Maranhão's father Alex Maranhão was also a footballer. A midfielder, he also played for Criciúma, and his daughter inherited his nickname.

Honours
Internacional
: 2021

References

2004 births
Living people
People from Criciúma
Brazilian footballers
Brazilian women's footballers
Women's association football forwards
Campeonato Brasileiro de Futebol Feminino Série A1 players
Sport Club Internacional (women) players
Santos FC (women) players